is a series of prize machine games developed and released by Namco, now known as Bandai Namco Entertainment for arcades in Japan. Up to four players use the metal shovels to scoop up candy and other prizes from a rotating plastic bowl inside the cabinet, and must have the prizes land on a moving table in order for the players to earn them. The original game was developed following requests for Namco to develop prize machine games as opposed to video arcade games in the late 1980s. The series first began in June 1987 with Sweet Land, and has received numerous updates and sequels, the latest of which being Sweet Land 5, released in August 2015 by Bandai Namco Entertainment.

Games

Related games

See also
Wide Wide Clipper - Similar series of prize machine arcade games.

References

Bandai Namco Entertainment franchises
Namco redemption games